The Cenotaph is a war memorial located within the Esplanade Park at Connaught Drive, within the Central Area in Singapore's central business district.

History
The inscription at the base of the Cenotaph reads:

They died that we might live.

The Cenotaph was built in memory of the 124 British soldiers born or resident in Singapore who gave their lives in World War I (1914–1918), with a second dedication (but no names) added in remembrance of those who died in World War II (1939–1945).

The structure was designed by Denis Santry of Swan & Maclaren. The foundation stone was laid by Sir Lawrence Nunns Guillemard, the Governor of the Straits Settlements, on 15 November 1920. In attendance was the visiting French Premier, Georges Clemenceau who was the French Minister of War from 1917 to 1919.

The memorial was completed in 1922, and was unveiled on 31 March that year by the young Prince Edward of Wales, later King Edward VIII then Duke of Windsor, during his Asia-Pacific tour. During the unveiling ceremony, a chaplain blessed the Cenotaph with the words, "The stone is well laid and truly laid to the Glory of God and the memory of the illustrious dead." Against the backdrop of the sea then fronting Queen Elizabeth Walk, Governor Guillemard awarded medals of courage to those who had served in the war.

In Prince Edward's entourage was Louis Mountbatten. At the end of World War II, Mountbatten returned to Singapore as the Supreme Commander of the South East Asia Command to receive the surrender of the Japanese at City Hall on 12 September 1945.

National Monument
On 28 December 2010, The Cenotaph was gazetted by Preservation of Monuments Board as a National Monument along with Lim Bo Seng Memorial and Tan Kim Seng Fountain at the Esplanade Park and the Singapore Conference Hall along Shenton Way.

Vandalism incident
On 23 April 2013, the Cenotaph was vandalised by someone who sprayed the word "DEMOCRACY" on the monument as well as an "X" which crossed out the text "1914 to 1918". Six days later, Mohamad Khalid Mohamad Yusop was arrested and charged with one count of vandalism under the Vandalism Act. On 26 August 2013, a district court ordered Khalid to pay S$208 for the cost of repairs in addition to sentencing him to three months' jail and three strokes of the cane.

See also
 Cenotaph
 History of Singapore
 Battle of Singapore
 Civilian War Memorial
 Kranji War Memorial
 Lim Bo Seng Memorial
 Former Indian National Army Monument

References

 National Heritage Board (2002), Singapore's 100 Historic Places, Archipelago Press,

External links

 National Heritage Board
 Roll of Honour - Singapore Cenotaph

National monuments of Singapore
Downtown Core (Singapore)
Buildings and structures completed in 1922
Landmarks in Singapore
Monuments and memorials in Singapore
Singapore
World War I memorials
World War II memorials
20th-century architecture in Singapore